"Peaches & Cream" is a song by American R&B quartet 112. Bad Boy Records released the song on March 13, 2001 as the second single from the album, Part III. Slim and Q share lead vocals with Mike handling the rap verse. The song was nominated for Best R&B Performance by a Duo or Group with Vocal at the 44th Grammy Awards in 2002. The song peaked at number two on the Billboard Hot R&B/Hip-Hop Singles & Tracks chart and number four on the Billboard Hot 100, staying in the Top 40 for 25 weeks and making it their highest-charting Hot 100 single to date as lead artists. It also topped the Billboard Rhythmic Top 40 chart. The group performed the song as part to commemorate Bad Boy's 20th anniversary as a record label at the BET Awards 2015.

Track listing 
"Peaches & Cream" – 3:13
"Dance with Me" – 3:43

Charts

Year-end charts

See also
 List of Billboard Rhythmic number-one songs of the 2000s

References 

2001 singles
112 (band) songs
Bad Boy Records singles
Music videos directed by Director X
Songs written by Mario Winans
Songs written by Sean Combs
2000 songs
Songs written by Daron Jones
Songs written by Poo Bear
Songs written by Slim (singer)
Songs written by Quinnes Parker